Nadiya Filipova (born 19 October 1959) is a Bulgarian rowing cox.

References 
 
 

1959 births
Living people
Bulgarian female rowers
Rowers at the 1980 Summer Olympics
Olympic silver medalists for Bulgaria
Coxswains (rowing)
Olympic rowers of Bulgaria
Medalists at the 1980 Summer Olympics